ATRL (previously known as Absolute TRL and PopFusion) is an Internet forum that discusses pop culture.

History 
Absolute TRL was founded in 1999, as a fan site of MTV's TV Show Total Request Live. In 2005, the main site was closed in favor of the forum. It got renamed to PopFusion in 2006, and retained that name for a year. In 2007 it was renamed to ATRL. Despite the cancelation of Total Request Live in late 2008, it continued operating as a general pop culture forum.

In 2017, ATRL gained media attention when a member of the forum discovered hidden artwork, and incomplete tracklist of Taylor Swift's then-upcoming sixth studio album, Reputation (2017), ahead of the official announcement on her website. In a BuzzFeed article on pop fandom culture, ATRL is described as a "space for fans to argue in favor of their chosen artist with statistics and ideas about cultural impact".

See also 
 List of Internet forums

References

External links
 
 Classic ATRL (forum archive) 

Internet properties established in 1999
Music Internet forums